Sir David Kim Hempleman-Adams,  (born 10 October 1956 in Swindon, Wiltshire) is an English industrialist and adventurer.

He is the first person to complete the Adventurers Grand Slam, by reaching the Geographic and Magnetic North and South Poles as well as climbing the highest peaks in all seven continents, the first person to fly to the North Pole in a balloon, and the first person to make a balloon crossing of the Atlantic in an open basket.

Early life
David Hempleman was born in Moredon, Swindon on 10 October 1956. Following his parents' divorce, he moved with his mother to Stoney Littleton near Bath, and, when she remarried, took his stepfather's surname Adams.

He took part in the Duke of Edinburgh's Award scheme at school, then pursued business studies at college in Manchester and at Bristol Polytechnic. At the same time, he started climbing with fellow student Steven Vincent.

Expeditions
He first summited Mount Everest in 1993, and summited Mount McKinley, Alaska, in 1980, and Mount Kilimanjaro in 1981.

In 1984, he successfully completed a solo expedition to the Magnetic North Pole without dogs, snow mobiles or air supplies. Also he led the first team in 1992 to walk unsupported to the Geomagnetic North Pole. This was described in the book A Race Against Time. In 1996, he completed a solo unsupported expedition to the South Pole on 5 January, sailed to the South Magnetic Pole on 19 February, and led a team of novices to ski to the Magnetic North Pole on 15 May. The book Toughing it Out describes David's first 20 years of adventuring.

In 1998 he joined Norwegian Rune Gjeldnes in an attempt to reach the Geographical North Pole, the final leg of his Grand Slam attempt, which he described in a book called Walking on Thin Ice.

He became the first man to fly a balloon over the North Pole in 2000, a trip that emulated the ill-fated attempt by Salomon August Andrée, a Swede, to fly to the North Pole in the 19th century and which he also described in a book called At The Mercy of the Wind.

He has made thirty Arctic expeditions and has reached the various Poles a record 14 times.

On 22 September 2003 he became the first person to cross the Atlantic Ocean in an open wicker basket Rozière balloon. The journey was from New Brunswick, Canada to north of Blackpool, UK.

In July 2004 he and co-pilot Lorne White flew a single engine Cessna from Cape Columbia in the north of Canada to Cape Horn at the southern tip of South America, covering 11,060 miles and arriving on 23 July after 12 days.

In June 2005, Hempleman-Adams staged the world's "highest" formal dinner party. Hempleman-Adams, Alan Veal, and fellow adventurer Bear Grylls ascended to 24,262 feet in a hot air balloon. Grylls and Veal, wearing formal attire, then climbed down to a dinner table suspended 40 feet below the balloon and dined on asparagus, salmon, and summer fruits, and finally parachuted down to earth.

In January 2007, Hempleman-Adams broke the quarter-century old world small sized hot air balloon altitude record, by ascending to 9,906 meters over Alberta, Canada; beating the previous record of 9,537 metres set by Carol Davis in New Mexico.

In July 2007 Hempleman-Adams crossed the Atlantic in the smallest helium balloon to break the record for that particular class of balloon flying this distance. His aim was to land the balloon in Ireland but he was blown over to England by strong winds. See Toshiba Challenge website.

In September 2009 he broke the endurance record for a flight using the smallest man-carrying helium balloon. He flew 200 miles from Butler, Missouri, to Cherokee, Oklahoma, in 14 hours and 15 minutes using the class AA-01 balloon. The previous record was an eight hours and 12 minutes flight undertaken by American Coy Foster in March 1983.

On 10 October 2008 Hempleman-Adams, along with co-pilot Jon Mason won the 52nd Gordon Bennett Cup, having flown a helium balloon from Albuquerque, New Mexico eventually landing over 1000 miles later near Madison, Wisconsin. They are the first British team to win the coveted prize in 102 years.

To coincide with the 100th anniversary of Scott's expedition to the South Pole, The Heart of the Great Alone was published with the Royal Collection. It brings together a selection of the astonishing photographs taken by Herbert Ponting and Frank Hurley with commentary and narration by David.

In September 2010 he competed in the Gordon Bennett 2010 balloon race held in the UK for the first time.

In May 2011 he led the Iceland Everest Expedition on the North Side of Everest. £1.2 Million was raised for their chosen charity.

In October 2011, along with co-pilot Jon Mason, David won the Americas Challenge Balloon race and in doing so set a new duration record for the race. They are the only British team to win both the Gordon Bennett Balloon Race and Americas Challenge.

Personal and family life
Hempleman-Adams has worked in the chemical manufacturing business. He joined his father's company, Robnor (later Robnorganic Systems), later becoming managing director. The company was sold to Mason Corporation in 1995. Subsequently, he was non-executive chairman of Global Resins. He was a non-executive director of XP Power, a PLC Company based in Singapore which manufactures in the US, Europe, China and Vietnam. He is chairman of Hempleman Investment Company, a commercial property company.

He lives in Wiltshire with his partner Dr Ros Smith  and has three daughters, Alicia, Camilla and Amelia, from his previous marriage.

In February 2020 his eldest daughter, Alicia Hempleman-Adams, set the World Female Altitude Record in an AX4 Class hot air balloon, at 4628m, and the British Female Duration Record at 1h 46min in the same flight. Aged 8, she became the youngest person to stand at the North Pole and in April 2005, aged 15, she became the youngest person to traverse Baffin Island.

In April 2008 his middle daughter, Camilla, at the age of 15, became the youngest person to ski the last degree to the North Pole.

In December 2011 his youngest daughter, Amelia, at the age of 16 became the youngest person to ski to the South Pole having completed Shackleton's last 98 nautical miles. In 2021 she competed at the Henley Royal Regatta.

Social and charitable work
He retired as a Trustee of St John Ambulance in 2021 having been involved with the charity for 26 years and having held senior since 1999. In 2002 he raised money to buy ambulances for St John through a series of lectures. In 2019 he sailed from Plymouth, U.K., to New York, to promote the work of St John and to encourage young people to try something new.

He retired as a Trustee of the Duke of Edinburgh's Award in 2017 having been a Trustee for 10 years.

He is a Trustee of The Royal Aero Club Trust.

In 1992 Hempleman-Adams co-founded The Mitchemp Trust, a registered youth development charity working with vulnerable young people aged 11 to 14 years old from across Wiltshire and the UK who are suffering the effects of poverty and rural isolation. The Mitchemp Trust subsequently rebranded as The Youth Adventure Trust.

In 2009 Hempleman-Adams founded Wicked Weather Watch, a charity aimed at informing young people about climate change.

In summer 2016, Hempleman-Adams successfully completed the Polar Ocean Challenge - an historic attempt to be the first British sailing yacht to sail around the Arctic Ocean in one summer season, circumnavigating the North Pole and sailing through the Northeast and Northwest Passages. This expedition was undertaken to increase awareness of climate change and loss of ice in the Arctic Ocean.

In October 2004, he was appointed a Deputy Lieutenant for Wiltshire. He was appointed High Sheriff of Wiltshire for 2016–17.

Honours and awards
In 2013 he was awarded the Polar Medal and bar by HM The Queen for services to the UK in the field of polar research.

He received the MBE in the Queen's Birthday Honours in 1995 and then the OBE in the Queen’s Birthday Honours in 1998 for services to Arctic Exploration.

He was appointed Lieutenant of the Royal Victorian Order (LVO) in the 2007 New Year Honours and Knight Commander of the Royal Victorian Order (KCVO) in the 2017 New Year Honours, both in recognition of his service to the Duke of Edinburgh's Award scheme.

In 2016 he was made a Knight of Justice of the Order of St John.

In 2000, he was awarded the Gold Medal of the Royal Aero Club.

In 2004, he was awarded ‘The Explorers Medal’, by The Explorers Club at their Centennial Dinner.

In 2022, he was awarded the Royal Geographical Society Founder's medal for 'enabling science through expeditions, and inspiring younger generations of geographers.' 

He became a Freeman of the City of London in 2008.

See also
List of Mount Everest summiters by number of times to the summit

References

External links
Wicked Weather Watch
Youth Adventure Trust

1956 births
English explorers
English polar explorers
Harmon Trophy winners
Explorers of the Arctic
Alumni of the University of the West of England, Bristol
Living people
People from Swindon
Deputy Lieutenants of Wiltshire
Knights Commander of the Royal Victorian Order
Officers of the Order of the British Empire
Officers of the Order of St John
Britannia Trophy winners
Flight altitude record holders
British summiters of Mount Everest
High Sheriffs of Wiltshire
Balloon flight record holders
British aviation record holders
Fellows of the Royal Scottish Geographical Society
Recipients of the Polar Medal